LJ Racing was a stock car racing team that competed in the NASCAR Winston Cup Series between 1997 and 2000. Owned by Joe Falk, the team posted a best finish of fifth with driver Todd Bodine, and a best Winston West Series finish of second with Mike Wallace driving. LJ Racing has since been revived as Circle Sport Racing.

Winston Cup Series

Car No. 91 history

Virginia businessman Joe Falk entered NASCAR team ownership in the Winston Cup Series in 1997, fielding the No. 91 Chevrolet in a partnership with Ron Neal under the LJ Racing banner. When the team began, Mike Wallace was the driver and Spam was the sponsor. Neal had been running the team as the No. 81 in the Busch Series as ProTech Motorsports.

That year, Wallace posted the team's best finish in any series, in the only Winston West Series race they ever entered, the 1997 Auto Club 200 at California Speedway. Having failed to qualify for the weekend's Winston Cup Series event, they posted a late entry to the West Series race, and Mike Wallace drove from the back of the field to finish second.

In the Winston Cup Series, the team struggled to make races, and Wallace was released midway through the season. Spam left the team shortly thereafter, and several other drivers drove the car later in the year, with little success. Towards the end of the year, Kevin Lepage joined the team. Lepage would drive the No. 91 through the first half of 1998 before leaving to join Roush Racing. He was replaced by Morgan Shepherd, and then Todd Bodine, who would score the team's best finish in the Cup Series, fifth, in the final race of the 1998 season, at Atlanta Motor Speedway.

LJ Racing began the 1999 season with driver Steve Grissom, but after Grissom failed to qualify for two of the first four races, he was replaced by Dick Trickle. For the rest of the season, the team attempted the majority of the races, but only made it into eight: seven with Trickle, and the Winston 500 at Talladega Superspeedway with Andy Hillenburg.

In 2000, the team would qualify for two races (at Atlanta and Richmond) with Todd Bodine driving, before closing down. Later that same year, the team's shop was used by Chip Ganassi Racing with Felix Sabates to house their three NASCAR Busch Series teams. The two teams also entered a No. 91 Chevrolet for Blaise Alexander in two races near the end of the season, but Alexander failed to qualify for both of them.

Drivers

Car No. 91 results

Busch Series
ProTech Motorsports was founded by Ron Neal and began competition in the NASCAR Busch Series during the 1996 season, with driver Todd Bodine. Running the No. 81 for most of the season, Bodine finished third in series points, scoring one win at South Boston Speedway. In the final race of the year, at Metro-Dade Homestead Motorsports Complex, he ran the No. 82, while Ron Neal's son Jeff Neal ran the team's regular No. 81.

The team was in financial trouble throughout the season, and was partially bought out by Joe Falk to run Winston Cup in 1997. The team ran the first four races of the 1997 NASCAR Busch Series season with Stanton Barrett before switching fully to Winston Cup.

Drivers

ARCA Racing Series 
For the 2001 season, LJ Racing closed their Winston Cup Series team and moved to the ARCA RE/MAX Series, competing in 21 of the 25 races held that season. The team's main drivers were Blaise Alexander and Joe Falk's son Jeff Falk, with Brent Glastetter and Roger Blackstock each driving in two races, Josh Richeson driving at Charlotte Motor Speedway, and Casey Mears making his ARCA debut in the team's final race at Talladega Superspeedway.

Drivers

References

External links 
 Joe Falk Owner Statistics - Racing-Reference.info
 Ron Neal Owner Statistics - Racing-Reference.info

Defunct NASCAR teams
Auto racing teams established in 1997
2000 disestablishments in the United States